Knight Bachelor is the oldest and lowest-ranking form of knighthood in the British honours system; it is the rank granted to a man who has been knighted by the monarch but not inducted as a member of one of the organised orders of chivalry. Women are not knighted; in practice, the equivalent award for a woman is appointment as Dame Commander of the Order of the British Empire (founded in 1917).

In 1900, 51 people were invested Knights Bachelor; 11 were to Irish subjects (including Edward Carson, on his appointment as Solicitor General for England and Wales), one was from Guernsey and 13 were people in other parts of the British Empire.

Knights Bachelor appointed in 1900 
Source: William A. Shaw, The Knights of England, vol. 2 (London: Sherratt and Hughes, 1906), pp. 405–408.

References 

Knights Bachelor
Lists of knights and dames
British honours system